Yu Xingze (Xiuyan, Liaoning Province, *1976) is a Chinese contemporary visual artist living between Bochum, Beijing and Shanghai.

Life 
Yu was born in the Liaoning Province, in northern China, in 1976. From 1996 to 2000 he completed his bachelor's degree at the Lu Xun Fine Arts Academy, in Shenyang, around 250 km north of his hometown Xiuyan. In 2001, at the age of 25, he moved to Europe to study at the Düsseldorf Academy of Fine Art under the German artist Jörg Immendorff. Fearing that the influence of the strong willed master would have suppressed his individual style and seeking for academic experience in more than only one establishment, he enrolled at the Academy of Fine Art in Kassel in 2002. In 2006, he earned his master's degree in painting at the Kunsthochschule Kassel, Germany, under Professor Jurgen Meyer. In 2013 he had his PhD from the School of Architecture of the Central Academy of Fine Arts, Beijing, China.  He is now an associate professor at School of Architecture and Urban Planning of the Tongji University in Shanghai and works between there, Beijing and Bochum. His works have been exhibited in Europe, China and the US.

Artistic work 
When studying abroad in Germany, Yu has found a transparent chemical fabric, solid and with closely, woven meshes, which could be seen through from front to back. This kid of fabric, after slightly processing, can be a painting medium. Its transparency implicates the creation of a hybrid dimension that consists of both the virtual space created through the artist's brush stokes and the physical space in front and behind the canvas. The painted net between the subject and the observer, the incisiveness of the chiaroscuro and the round thicker layers of colour tidily painted by the artist at regular distance collaborate to intensify this effect. The "spatialisation“ and "sensitisation“ of painting have already become a new trend of this era, and this group of transparent paintings by Yu just corresponds to this new indication, being of great inspiration for the development of painting methods.

Thematically, one has the impression that the world, in which the subjects of Yu Xingze's painting live, is a rather mysterious one. Gorillas, a gun, philanthropists, scientists, a nobel peace prize laureate, toys, heroes, flowers, stars: the effort of finding a logical contact point between them is regularly nullified by their variety. Once disproved a thematic rational categorisation, one can only let go and enter the evanescent world created by the artist to storage and process every piece of information he gathers. In this optic, the spatial dimension he creates with his sophisticated techniques only serves the purpose of housing this ephemeral mind constructs, clearly affirming their contingency thought daring stylistic choices.

Solo exhibitions 
His selected solo exhibitions include: 
 X City, Shanghai Urban Planning Exhibition Centre, China, 2017
 Yu Xingze 2013-2015 Painting Exhibition, Chun Art Museum in Shanghai, China, 2016 
 Animal Brain, Schiller Gallery in Heidelberg, Germany, 2015 
 The self is not a reference, Chun Art Museum Shanghai, China, 2015
 Visual Paradise – Three Worlds About Yu Xingze, Sishang Art Museum in Beijing, China, 2014
 All Promising Phenomena, Meta Gallery, Shanghai, China, 2014
 The Transparent of Reflection, Modern Art Space, Shanghai Himalaya Museum, Shanghai, China, 2013
 Free Toys, Huayi Gallery, Guangzhou, China, 2010
 Free Toys, M Art space, Shanghai, China, 2010
 Bubbles, Academy of Fine Arts, University of Kassel, Germany, 2006
 Tower, Stellerk Gallery, Kassel, Germany, 2004
 Color-Feeling, Sparkasse, Bochum, Germany, 2002

Group exhibitions 
His selected group exhibitions include: 
 Art & Antique Vienna Hofburg, Vienna, Austria Schütz Fine Art-Chinese Department, 2018
 Fair for Art Vienna, Vienna, Austria Schütz Fine Art-Chinese Department, 2018
 Art & Antique Residenz Salzburg (March and August), Salzburg, Austria, Schütz Fine Art-Chinese Department Art & Antique, 2018
 Art & Antique Vienna Hofburg, Vienna, Austria Schütz Fine Art-Chinese Department, 2017
 Mutual Supplementary and Conformity, Chinese contemporary art invitational exhibition, Ludwig Art Museum, Koblenz, Germany, 2016
 Another Germany, Duisburg Art Hall, Duisburg, Germany, 2016
 Portrait Now! National Museum of Denmark, Copenhagen, Denmark, 2015
 New Family, Chun Museum Shanghai, China, 2015
 Remember, Shuangcheng, Art Exhibit, Duolun Museum, Shanghai, China, 2015       
 Five Chinese Artists, Bremen city Hall, Bremen, Germany, 2014      
 Portrait Time Art Museum, Beijing, China, 2014     
 Naive - Opening Exhibition, Eleven Art Museum, Shanghai, China, 2014        
 Thawing and Sink, Opening Exhibition, Museum of New Art, Hangzhou, China, 2014        
 Images Pingshan - Exhibition of famous works of Chinese and foreign sculpture, Shenzhen, China, 2014
 Seoul Guanghua Gate International Art Festival, Sejong cultural center, Seoul, South Korea, 2014     
 Yuan Shitao: a case study of non sociology, modern Art Space of Zendai Himalaya Art Museum, Shanghai, China 2014
 TALK ON THE HORSE,  XI Gallery, Shanghai, China, 2014       
 Perpetual Motion, Contemporary Art Invitational Exhibition, Global port Art Museum, Shanghai, China, 2014
 Seoul World Open Art Exhibition, Sejong Cultural Center, Seoul, South Korea, 2014
 The Media & Method in the Contemporary Painting, Sishang Art Museum, Beijing, China, 2013 
 China Youth Art Exhibition, SAP Exhibition Centre, Heidelberg, Germany, 2012
 Pulse of Asia, China contemporary art exhibition, Bangkok Contemporary Art Museum, Bangkok, Thailand, 2011
 Super Organism – The 1st CAFAM Biennale, Beijing, China, 2011
 Time and Space Survey, 21 Art Center, Shanghai, China, 2010
 The Opening Exhibition of Shangshagn Museum, ShangShang Museum, Beijing, China, 2009
 Leaving the Spotlights, New York Contemporary Art Center, New York, United States, 2008
 The New Art from China - First Art Fair of Washington, Chinese Art Section, International Conference Center, Washington, D.C., United States, 2007
 EXAMEN 06, Kassel Train Station Right Wing, Kassel, Germany, 2006
 NORD ART 2006 - the 10th International Art Exhibition, Büdelsdorf, Germany, 2006
 Dongbei 20 Years Art Exhibition, Guangdong Museum, Guangzhou, China, 2006
 NORD ART 2005 - Mysterious Art - the 9th International Art Exhibition, Büdelsdorf, Germany, 2005
 NORD ART 2004 - Unlimited - the 8th International Art Exhibition, Büdelsdorf, Germany, 2004
 Six Young Artists from Kassel, Aachen Museum, Aachen, Germany, 2004

Selected works 
Dalai Lama, oil on transparent canvas, 130 x 90 cm, 2013, Schütz Fine Art - Chinese Department
Golden Gun, oil on transparent canvas, 60 x 90 cm, 2013, Schütz Fine Art - Chinese Department
Hi Flower-Irises, oil on transparent canvas, radius: 50 cm, 2013, Schütz Fine Art - Chinese Department
Hi Flower-Poppy, oil on transparent canvas, radius: 50 cm, 2013
Hi Flower-Rosa Chinensis, oil on transparent canvas, radius: 50 cm, 2013
The Gorilla Looking Far Into The Distance 5, oil on transparent canvas, 100 x 70 cm, 2013
The Gorilla Looking Far Into The Distance 2, oil on transparent canvas, 100 x 70 cm 2013
The Gorilla Looking Far Into The Distance 4, oil on transparent canvas, 100 x 70 cm, 2013

Bibliography 
 Building Bridges, Masterworks of Contemporary Chinese Art, Schütz Fine Art Chinese Department, 2015.
 All Promising Phenomena, Xingze Yu Solo Exhibition, meta gallery, 2014.
 Yu Xingze’s Works, catalogue exhibition The Transparency of Reflection, 2014.
 Free to Xingze plaything: Works Guangdong people's Fine Arts Publishing House
 In Xingze works, Jiangxi Fine Arts Publishing House, 2014 
 Visual art Xingze Park - in the world, Intellectual Property Press, 2014 (edited by Wang Meng)
 In Xingze: 2013-2015 painting works, Liaoning Fine Arts Publishing House,

See also 
 Central Academy of Fine Arts
 Tongji Universität
 Lu Xun Academy of Fine Arts
 Jörg Immendorff

External links 
FREE TOYS - A CRITIC ON YU XINGZE'S LATEST WORKS, by Wang Huangsheng
Schütz Fine Art Chinese Department - Yu Xingze
Curitiba Biennial ´17
Galerie Schiller, CV Yu Xingze
Artnet - Yu Xingze
Where is my little pink Pony - Yu Xingze
X CITY: A FULL INTERPRETATION OF YU XINGZE’S WORKS I
YU XINGZE: DEPICTING THE UNKNOWN “EL ALEPH”
FindArt Info - Yu Xingze
Kunstforum: Chinironia – Ironie in China? - Yu Xingze

References 

1973 births
Living people
Chinese contemporary artists
Artists from Liaoning
People from Anshan